Dhaya Haroon is a football midfielder playing at Al-Nassr Club in Saudi Arabia.

He started playing for the first team in 2005-2006 season after joining from Al-Ansar.

External links
Profile at goalzz.com

Saudi Arabian footballers
Al-Ansar FC (Medina) players
Al Nassr FC players
Al-Raed FC players
Abha Club players
Al-Jabalain FC players
Sdoos Club players
1980 births
Living people
Saudi First Division League players
Saudi Professional League players
Saudi Second Division players
Association football midfielders